Kawin Kachendecha is a Thai coach. He has led the side since 2008. He previously led Thailand Premier League side Thailand Tobacco Monopoly FC in 2008, but left midseason to take over the youngsters of the national team.

Teams managed

Thailand Tobacco Monopoly: 2008
Thailand U-20: 2007-2008
J.W. Rangsit F.C.: 2011-2012

International experience
Kachendecha led the Tobacco side in the Singapore Cup.

References

Kawin Kachendecha
Living people
Year of birth missing (living people)